The University of Idaho Golf Course is an 18-hole public facility in the northwest United States, on the campus of the University of Idaho in Moscow, Idaho.

The back tees measure a moderate , but the significant elevation changes, terraced fairways, and often breezy conditions contribute to make it a challenging track.

The course is open eight months per year, March through October, and is located on the western end of Nez Perce Drive, directly south of the Kibbie Dome stadium and the century-old Shattuck Arboretum. The newer UI Arboretum borders on the east, along and below the 17th & 18th holes. The President's House (now Executive Residence) is across the street, northeast of the 18th green.

History
The first nine holes were opened  in 1937, on the southwest edge of campus, designed by Englishman Francis L. "Frank" James (1877-1952). At the time a Portland resident, he had designed over a hundred courses, including the other two 9-hole courses in the area: the Moscow Elks course east of town in the late 1920s, and the reconstruction of the original WSC course in nearby Pullman, Washington in 1934. James became the course manager, resident professional, and UI golf coach. Following his death in 1952, the recently completed clubhouse was named for him.

Before the second nine was constructed, there was also a pitch-and-putt course north of the original nine holes.

The second nine holes (four east (# 10, 16-18) and five north & west (# 3-7) of the original nine) were constructed from 1968 to 1970, designed by golf course architect Bob E. Baldock, and the current clubhouse was built in 1969. A former professional golfer from Newport Beach, California, Baldock designed hundreds of courses in the West, including Hangman Valley south of Spokane, Sun Willows in Pasco, Crane Creek C.C. in Boise, Meadow Creek in New Meadows, and the Lewiston Country Club.

All 18 holes at the UI course opened for play  in August 1970 with some minor modifications to the original nine. The front and back nines were switched in the 1990s, and both nines contain original holes and newer ones. The course was formerly par 71, as the 7th hole (formerly #16), currently a downhill par-5, was a par-4 prior to the addition of new tee boxes and the greenside pond. The greenside ponds on the current 1st and 7th holes were added in the mid-1990s.

The par-5 fourth hole was part of the grade of the old road to Pullman. The massive water tank behind its green (west) was added in 1980 to satisfy insurance requirements for campus firefighting; the tank north of the tee box was completed in 2010, for chilled water storage for campus air conditioning.

The course was originally owned and operated by the Associated Students of the University of Idaho (ASUI), the student government. The university took control of the course in 1986, and the lounge was remodeled in 1990.

The UI course became the senior 18-hole venue on the Palouse  in 2008, when Washington State University in Pullman opened its long-anticipated Palouse Ridge Golf Club in late August.

Vandal Golf & Professional Golf Management
The UI Golf Course is the home of the Vandal golf teams, which compete in the Big Sky Conference of the NCAA. Idaho was formerly a member of the Western Athletic Conference (WAC) (2005–14), Big West (1996–2005), Big Sky (1963–96), and Pacific Coast (1922–59) conferences.

The university offers a bachelor's degree in Professional Golf Management, a five-year program in the College of Business and Economics.  Launched in 2002, it is the only PGA-accredited college program in the Northwest and one of 20 in the nation.

Scorecard

References

External links
  
UI Library - Campus Photograph Collection - UI Golf Course
 Go Vandals.com - UI golf - men's team
2010-11 media guide
 Go Vandals.com - UI golf - women's team
2010-11 media guide
 Gem of the Mountains - 1950 UI yearbook, p. 240, Frank James and 1950 Vandal golf team

Golf clubs and courses in Idaho
College golf clubs and courses in the United States
University of Idaho buildings and structures
Tourist attractions in Latah County, Idaho
1937 establishments in Idaho